The 2014–15 Trabzonspor season was the club's 40th consecutive season in the Süper Lig. During the season, Trabzonspor also took part in the Turkish Cup and the UEFA Europa League.

Squad

Transfers

In

Out

Competitions

Süper Lig

Turkish Cup

Uefa Europa League

Group stage

References

2014–15
Turkish football clubs 2014–15 season
2014–15 UEFA Europa League participants seasons